Sekong (or Xekong; Lao ເຊກອງ) is the capital city of Sekong Province, Sekong District, Laos. It was created in 1984 after it was ascertained that Ban Phon's unexploded ordnance made it uninhabitable.

References

Populated places in Sekong Province